The 1894 Colorado Agricultural football team represented Colorado Agricultural College (now known as Colorado State University) in the Colorado Football Association (CFA) during the 1894 college football season.  In its rivalry game with Colorado, played on October 27 in Boulder, the team lost by a 67 to 0 score.  The team had no coach.

Colorado Agricultural College President Alston Ellis disbanded the team after one game in the 1894 season. The football program returned upon Ellis' departure from the school in 1899.

Schedule

References

Colorado Agricultural
Colorado State Rams football seasons
Colorado Agricultural football